Robert P. Hymes is an American historian and sinologist whose work has focused on the socio-cultural history of early modern China. Hymes is the Horace Walpole Carpentier Professor of Oriental Studies, East Asian Languages and Cultures at Columbia University.

Biography 
Hymes received his B.A. from Columbia College, his M.A. and Ph.D. from the University of Pennsylvania. His scholarship has focused on Chinese society during the Song and Yuan dynasties.

Hymes won the Joseph Levenson Book Prize twice from the Association for Asian Studies for his books Statesmen and Gentlemen: The Elite of Fu-chou, Chiang-hsi, in Northern and Southern Sung (Cambridge, 1986) and Way and Byway: Taoism, Local Religion, and Models of Divinity in Sung and Modern China (California, 2002).

References 

Living people
Columbia University faculty
Historians of China
American sinologists
Columbia College (New York) alumni
University of Pennsylvania alumni
Year of birth missing (living people)